Étueffont is a commune in the Territoire de Belfort department in Bourgogne-Franche-Comté in northeastern France.

History
The separate villages of Étueffont-Bas (founded in the 16th century, with 28 families in 1760) and Étueffont-Haut (founded in the 12th century, with 38 families in 1760) were merged into the current commune on 12 June 1973.

Geography
The town sits at the foot of the Vosges mountains on the banks of the river Madeleine, in the Regional Natural Park Les Ballons des Vosges.

Sights
In the village center an 18th-century smithy houses a Forge Museum that commemorates four generations of blacksmiths working in the village from 1843 to 1977.

See also

Communes of the Territoire de Belfort department

References

Communes of the Territoire de Belfort